Zeynelabidîn Zinar (born 1953) is a Kurdish writer and researcher. He was born in the village of Hedhedk in the district of Beşiri in 1953. He has been one of the main figures in the area of Kurdish folklore. Moreover, he has changed many classical Kurdish texts from Arabic script to the Kurdish Latin-based script. Between 1986 and 2006, he has published around seventy books in the Kurdish language. His main work is a ten volume book on the Kurdish folklore and oral traditions, called Xwençe. It took him twelve years to complete this work, and its twelve volumes were published between 1989-1997 in Sweden.

Works

Kurdish Folklore
 Xwençe, Vol.I, Kurdî/kurmancî, folklore, Pencînar Kurdish Culture Publishers, Sverige/Stockholm, 1989, 278 pages,  
Xwençe, Vol. II, Kurdî/kurmancî, folklore, Pencînar Kurdish Culture Publishers, Sverige/Stockholm, 1990, 288 pages, 
Xwençe, Vol III, Kurdî/kurmancî, folklore, Pencînar Kurdish Culture Publishers, Sverige/Stockholm, 1991, 297 pages, 
Xwençe, Vol. IV, Kurdî/kurmancî, folklore, Pencînar Kurdish Culture Publishers, Sverige/Stockholm, 1990, 262 pages, 
Xwençe, Vol. V, Kurdî/kurmancî, folklore, Pencînar Kurdish Culture Publishers, Sverige/Stockholm, 1991, 293 pages,  
Xwençe, Vol. VI, Kurdî/kurmancî, folklore, Pencînar Kurdish Culture Publishers, Sverige/Stockholm, 1993, 266 pages, 
Xwençe, Vol.VII, Kurdî/kurmancî, folklore, Pencînar Kurdish Culture Publishers, Sverige/Stockholm, 1994, 280 pages, 
Xwençe, Vol.VIII, Kurdî/kurmancî, folklore, Pencînar Kurdish Culture Publishers, Sverige/Stockholm, 1995, 288 pages, 
Xwençe, Vol.IX, Kurdî/kurmancî, folklore, Pencînar Kurdish Culture Publishers, Sverige/Stockholm, 1996, 290 pages, 
Xwençe, Vol. X, Kurdî/kurmancî, folklore, Pencînar Kurdish Culture Publishers, Sverige/Stockholm, 1997, 268 pages,

Other works

Siyabend û Xecê, Folklore-Biography, Sverige/Stockholm, 1992, 160 pages, 
Bingeha Çîroka Kurdî (Foundations of the Kurdish Story), Kurdî/kurmancî, Sverige/Stockholm, 12/2000, 134 pages,

References

1953 births
Kurdish-language writers
Living people
Kurdish social scientists